Events from the year 1114 in Ireland.

Incumbents
High King of Ireland: Domnall Ua Lochlainn

Events
First entry from Mac Carthaigh's Book
Diarmait Ua Briain becomes King of Munster

Deaths
 Maelcoluim Ua Cormacain, Abbot of Aran